Larry Eugene Andersen (born May 6, 1953) is an American former relief pitcher in Major League Baseball and current radio color commentator for the Philadelphia Phillies. From  through , Andersen played for the Cleveland Indians (1975), Seattle Mariners (–), Philadelphia Phillies (–, –1994), Houston Astros (–), Boston Red Sox (1990), and San Diego Padres (–).

Playing and coaching career
Andersen possessed an average fastball and outstanding slider. He was drafted out of high school in the seventh round in 1971 by the Cleveland Indians. He signed immediately. In 1972 in his first full season he played for Reno of the California League, going 4–14, with a 6.53 ERA in 124 innings, with a 1.80 WHIP. 

He gained notoriety for his 1990 trade to the Red Sox straight up for minor league prospect Jeff Bagwell. Andersen played a month in Boston.

In a 17-season career, Andersen posted a 40–39 record with 49 saves and a 3.15 ERA in 699 games pitched. His best season was  when he recorded nine wins, 94 strikeouts, and 101 innings pitched in 67 games, all career highs. He is the only member of the Phillies to play in both the 1983 World Series and the 1993 World Series (Darren Daulton had been called up in September 1983, but did not make the post-season roster that year).

Andersen during the 1982 season pulled a prank on manager Rene Lachemann during a series in Chicago. Referred to as the ‘Mr. Jello’ caper, Andersen, along with teammates Ritchie Zisk and Joe Simpson moved all the furniture in the hotel suite into a bathroom, filled both toilets with jello and removed the mouthpiece from the phone. The trio were not revealed as the culprits until after the season ended.

On May 13, 1986, he was released by the Philadelphia Phillies. Three days later he was signed as a free agent by the Houston Astros, who released him on November 12. 

On December 21, 1986, he was signed as a free agent by the Houston Astros, who released him on November 9, 1987.

In , Andersen was a player/coach for the Reading Phillies after he failed to make the Major League club out of Spring Training. He spent the following two seasons as the pitching coach for the Scranton/Wilkes-Barre Red Barons.

Broadcasting career
Andersen joined Philadelphia's broadcast team as a color commentator prior to the  season, filling the position left vacant by the death of Richie Ashburn late in the 1997 campaign. Andersen worked on both television and radio from 1998 to 2006 before moving exclusively to radio in 2007. Early in his broadcasting tenure, Andersen occasionally provided television color commentary when the Phillies were featured regionally on Fox Saturday afternoon telecasts. During the 2007 season, he began doing play-by-play work on Phillies radio broadcasts during the fifth and sixth innings, but returned to full-time color commentary in 2008.

During his broadcasting career, Andersen said, "In the seventh inning fans all get up and sing 'Take Me Out to the Ball Game,' and they're already there. It's really a stupid thing to say and I don't know who made 'em sing it. Why would somebody that's there get up and sing take me out to the ball game? The first person to do it must have been a moron." The moron in question was fellow broadcaster Harry Caray.

In 2012, Andersen was ranked #12 on the MLB Network Countdown of the Top 25 personalities in Major League Baseball history.

References

Further reading
The ESPN Baseball Encyclopedia – Gary Gillette, Peter Gammons, Pete Palmer. Publisher: Sterling Publishing, 2005. Format: Paperback, 1824pp. Language: English.

External links

Larry Andersen at SABR (Baseball BioProject)
Larry Andersen at Baseball Almanac
Larry Andersen at Pura Pelota (Venezuelan Professional Baseball League)

1953 births
Living people
Bellevue Bulldogs baseball players
Bellevue College alumni
Boston Red Sox players
Cleveland Indians players
Gulf Coast Indians players
High Desert Mavericks players
Houston Astros players
Major League Baseball broadcasters
Major League Baseball pitchers
Minor league baseball coaches
Oklahoma City 89ers players
Baseball players from Portland, Oregon
Navegantes del Magallanes players
Philadelphia Phillies announcers
Philadelphia Phillies players
Portland Beavers players
Reading Phillies players
Reno Silver Sox players
Salt Lake City Gulls players
San Antonio Brewers players
San Diego Padres players
Scranton/Wilkes-Barre Red Barons players
Seattle Mariners players
Tacoma Tugs players
Tiburones de La Guaira players
Toledo Mud Hens players
Williamsport Tomahawks players
Baseball coaches from Oregon
American expatriate baseball players in Venezuela